Rhythm in the Clouds is a 1937 American film directed by John H. Auer.

Plot 
Struggling songwriter Judy Walker gets two hours notice to vacate her room. In frustration, she accidentally spills "ink eraser" on her latest rejection letter, which gives her an idea. She alters the letter, giving herself authorization to use the rejecter's luxurious Park Avenue apartment while he, "uncle" Phil Hale, is away.

Then she receives a phone call from the J. C. Boswell Advertising Co.; Boswell is anxious to hear Hale's new music. She decides to submit her own compositions, including "Mad Symphony", adding Hale's name as co-composer. Luigi, Boswell's musical evaluator, does not like her work, but dissatisfied client Maggie Conway does (for her cosmetics-promoting radio show). Boswell's longsuffering assistant, Clyde Lyons, suggests Bob McKay write the lyrics and sing as well. Conway loves the idea, but that presents a problem: he and Hale hate each other (over a woman).

Lyons sees McKay. He is not interested at first, but the music changes his mind. Lyons also learns that McKay is feuding with the unseen next-door neighbor, furious that she is making so much noise. Lyons knows that neighbor is Walker, so he tries to keep them apart. He fails, but they do not realize they are neighbors, and they are attracted to each other.

For the female singer, Lyons suggests Dorothy Day. Conway likes his idea, but after she leaves, Boswell is furious. The woman that McKay and Hale fought over is Day, who is now Hale's fiancée. Fortunately, with Luigi's help, Lyons persuades her to take the job, lying and saying that Hale and McKay have resolved their differences.

When Walker and McKay find out they are the hated neighbors, their budding romance comes to an abrupt end. Further complications ensue when Lyons gets Hale to return early. When he finds out what Walker has done, Hale is determined to denounce her on the first radio performance, but McKay fixes everything and reconciles with Walker.

Cast 
 Patricia Ellis as Judy Walker
 Warren Hull as Bob McKay
 William Newell as Clyde Lyons
 Richard Carle as J. C. Boswell
 Zeffie Tilbury as Maggie Conway, the Duchess de Lovely
 Charles Judels as Luigi Fernando
 Robert Paige as Phil Hale (billed as David Carlyle)
 Joyce Compton as Amy Lou
 Suzanne Kaaren as Dorothy Day
 Esther Howard as Mrs. Madigan
 Eddie Parker as Baxter (as Ed Parker)
 James C. Morton as Cop
 Rolfe Sedan as Victor
 Richard Beach as Ben Graham
 Ranny Weeks as Radio Announcer

Soundtrack 
 Warren Hull - "Don't Ever Change" (Written by Walter Hirsch and Lou Handman)
 Suzanne Kaaren - "Hawaiian Hospitality" (Written by Harry Owens and Ray Kinney)
 Suzanne Kaaren and Warren Hull - "Two Hearts are Dancing" (Written by Walter Hirsch and Lou Handman)
 Hull and Patricia Ellis - "Two Hearts are Dancing"
 Patricia Ellis - "Mad Symphony"

Reception 
TV Guide rated Rhythm in the Clouds 2/5 stars and called it a "zesty little picture" that has too few songs to be called a musical.

References

External links 

1937 films
American musical comedy films
American black-and-white films
1930s English-language films
Republic Pictures films
Films directed by John H. Auer
Films set in New York City
1937 musical comedy films
1930s American films